Skarp may refer to:

 Skarp (band), American grindcore band
 Skarp Technologies, American company developing a laser-based razor
 IF Skarp, Norwegian association football club